Frederick William Crack (12 January 1919 – 2002) was an English professional footballer who played as a winger.

References

1919 births
2002 deaths
People from Lincoln, England
English footballers
Association football wingers
Lincoln CSOB F.C. players
Grimsby Town F.C. players
English Football League players